The 29th Annual Nickelodeon Kids' Choice Awards was held on March 12, 2016, at The Forum in Inglewood, California, live on Nickelodeon and either live or on tape delay across all of Nickelodeon's international networks and also served as a full-length TV movie. Country singer Blake Shelton hosted the ceremony. A simulcast was also carried in the United States on sister channels Nicktoons, TeenNick, TV Land, and CMT, as well as on Nick Radio, to maximize ratings numbers, the show drew 3,321,000 on Nickelodeon and 4.426 million on all the channels put together.

There was one award that wasn't announced during the ceremony, the award for Favorite TV Actor – Kids Show. However, Ross Lynch won the award after the ceremony ended. A new series, School of Rock, which is based on the 2003 film of the same name, premiered after the ceremony.

Host 
 Blake Shelton

Pre-show host
 Charlie Puth

Performers

Presenters (in order of appearance)

Winners and nominees 
 The nominees were announced on February 2, 2016.
 Winners are listed first, in bold. Other nominees are in alphabetical order.

Movies

Television

Music

Others

International

Asia 

Favorite Asian Sports Star
 Kim Kurniawan (Indonesia)
 Jeron Teng (Philippines)
 Pandelela Rinong (Malaysia)
 Irfan Fandi (Singapore)

Favorite Pinoy Personality
 Enrique Gil
 James Reid
 Kathryn Bernardo
 Maine Mendoza

Brazil 
Favorite Brazilian Artist
 Fly
 Anitta
 Biel
 Ludmilla
 MC Gui
 Zé Felipe

Latin America 

Favorite Latin Artist
 Mario Bautista
 Julián Serrano
 Lali Espósito
 María Gabriela de Faría
 Paty Cantú
 Sebastián Villalobos

Europe

France

Favorite French singer 
 Black M
 Soprano
 Louane Emera
 Fréro Delavega

Italy

Favorite Italian Singer 
 The Kolors
 Michele Bravi
 Alessio Bernabei
 Benji e Fede

Favorite Italian Youtuber 
 Sofia Viscardi
 Alberico de Giglio
 Antony di Francesco
 Leonardo Decarli

Denmark 
 Benjamin Lasnier
 Cisilia
 Christopher
 Lukas Graham

Germany, Austria, Switzerland

Favorite Celebrity 
 Cro
 Mark Forster
 Lena Meyer-Landrut
 Elyas M'Barek

Favorite YouTuber 
 Julien Bam
 Dagi Bee
 Bratayley
 Freshtorge
 EthanGamerTV

The Netherlands & Belgium 

Favorite Dutch Celebrity
 B-Brave
 Chantal Janzen
 Jandino
 MainStreet
 Ronnie Flex
 Timor Steffens

Favorite Flemish Celebrity
 Dimitri Vegas & Like Mike
 Emma Bale
 Ian Thomas
 K3
 Natalia
 Niels Destadsbader

Favorite Vlogger 
 Acid (Belgium)
 Beautynezz (The Netherlands)
 Dylan Haegens (The Netherlands)
 Enzo Knol (The Netherlands)
 Furtjuh (The Netherlands)
 Unagize (Belgium)

Hungary

Poland

Favorite Polish Star 
 Dawid Kwiatkowski
 Margaret
 Robert Lewandowski
 Sarsa

Portugal 
 D.A.M.A
 Agir
 Filipe Gonçalves
 Carlão

Spain

Favorite Music Act 
 Calum
 Lucía Gil
 Maverick
 Sweet California

UK & Ireland

UK Favourite Music Act 
 Fleur East
 Little Mix
 Nathan Sykes
 One Direction
 Rixton
 The Vamps

UK Favourite Tipster 
 Ethan Gamer TV
 iBallisticSquid
 Alia
 Mr. Stampy Cat
 Spencer FC
 The Diamond Mine Cart

UK Favourite Fan Family 
 Arianators
 Beliebers
 Directioners
 Mixers
 Swifties
 Vampettes

UK Favourite Famous Cat 
 Grumpy Cat
 Meredith Grey
 Olivia Benson
 Prince Essex
 Sam
 Venus

UK Favourite Sports Star 
 Andy Murray
 Ellie Simmonds
 Harry Kane
 Jessica Ennis-Hill
 Lewis Hamilton
 Steph Houghton

UK Favourite Breakthrough Vlogger 
 Cherry Wallis
 Jazzybum
 Mynameschai
 Noodlerella
 Raphael Gomes
 Sam King FTW

UK Favourite Music Video 
 "Hello" by Adele
 "Sax" by Fleur East
 "Hold My Hand" by Jess Glynne
 "Black Magic" by Little Mix
 "Drag Me Down" by One Direction
 "We All Want the Same Thing" by Rixton

Slimed Celebrities 
 Blake Shelton- The host was the mystery celebrity slimed at the end of the show.
 Fifth Harmony- The girls were slimed whilst collecting the 'Best Female Group' award.

Middle East and North Africa 

Favorite Arab Act 
 Hala Al Turk
 Hamza Hawsawi
 Mohammed Assaf
 THE 5

References

External links 
 
 Official website (archived)

Nickelodeon Kids' Choice Awards
2016 awards in the United States
2016 in American television
2016 in California
2016 television awards
March 2016 events in the United States